Port Sinister (a.k.a. Beast of Paradise Isle in the UK) is a 1953 American independently made black-and-white adventure science fiction film, produced by Jack Pollexfen and Albert Zugsmith, and directed by  Harold Daniels. The film was written by Jack Pollexfen and Aubrey Wisberg and stars James Warren, Lynne Roberts, and Paul Cavanagh. Port Sinister was theatrically distributed by RKO Radio Pictures.

The film's storyline involves the 17th-century Caribbean city of Port Royal in the mid-20th century.

Plot
The sunken Caribbean city of Port Royal had been long rumored to have been visited by pirates who rise from the ocean floor. In the mid-17th century, the port was a thriving seaport, but it was heavily damaged in 1692 and by an earthquake and had suffered numerous hurricanes which had prevented the port from regaining its former glory. A 1907 earthquake caused the city to sink beneath the waves.

A scientist (Tony) believes that the older portions of the city will soon become visible due to predicted volcanic activity, and after obtaining grant funding, wants to investigate.

Before arriving on the island, thugs local to the area plan to steal all the gold when Port Royal becomes visible. They attack Tony, leaving him hospitalized and steal his research material in their quest to find the rumored pirate's gold.

Tony escapes the hospital, and arranges passage to the island. He is forced to take Joan with him, and she is disgruntled having been forced to accompany an exhibition whose theory she finds unlikely.

The ruins are now visible as predicted and the criminals obtain the treasure. The two groups happen to meet and are suddenly attacked by giant crabs. Volcanoes begin to erupt as the two groups fight for the treasure and to escape the now sinking city.

Production

Pollexfen and Wisberg had already made Captive Women and Sword of Venus for RKO. Port Sinister was filmed at the RKO studios with location work at Palos Verdes California. Third and final film made by American Pictures Company by these producers. The movie had the working titles of Port Royal-Ghost City Beneath the Sea, Sunken City and City Beneath the Sea. It was based on the real city of Port Royal.

Reception

Variety found the film to be a very mediocre melodrama. In the book RKO Radio Pictures, the movie was found to have dark filming, the lead acting insufficient and the movie otherwise boring, but it did find the villains of the movie of interest. Leonard Maltin gave the movie two of four stars, liking the premise of the movie, but finding the acting and the crab effects lacking.

References

Bibliography
 Warren, Bill. Keep Watching the Skies! American Science Fiction Movies of the Fifties, 21st Century Edition. Jefferson, North Carolina: McFarland & Company, 2009 (First Edition 1982). .

External links 
 

1953 films
American science fiction adventure films
1950s science fiction adventure films
Films scored by Albert Glasser
American black-and-white films
RKO Pictures films
Films produced by Aubrey Wisberg
Films set in Jamaica
Port Royal
Films with screenplays by Aubrey Wisberg
1950s English-language films
Films directed by Harold Daniels
1950s American films